The 2018 Tulane Green Wave football team represented Tulane University in the 2018 NCAA Division I FBS football season. The Green Wave played their home games at Yulman Stadium in New Orleans, Louisiana, and competed in the West Division of the American Athletic Conference. They were led by third-year head coach Willie Fritz. They finished the season 7–6, 5–3 in AAC play to finish in a three way tie for the West Division championship. After tiebreakers, they did not represent the West Division in the AAC Championship Game. They were invited to the Cure Bowl where they defeated Louisiana to win their first bowl game since 2002.

Previous season
The Green Wave finished the 2017 season 5–7, 3–5 in AAC play to finish in fifth place in the West Division.

Preseason

Award watch lists
Listed in the order that they were released

AAC media poll
The AAC media poll was released on July 24, 2018, with the Green Wave predicted to finish in fifth place in the AAC West Division.

Roster

Schedule

Schedule Source:

Game summaries

Wake Forest

Nicholls State

at UAB

at Ohio State

Memphis

at Cincinnati

SMU

at Tulsa

at South Florida

East Carolina

at Houston

Navy

vs. Louisiana (Cure Bowl)

Players drafted into the NFL

References

Tulane
Tulane Green Wave football seasons
Cure Bowl champion seasons
Tulane Green Wave football